Gremyashchy (lit. "thunderous"; alternate spellings Gremyashchiy, Gremyaschi, and Gremyashchi) can refer to a number of Russian or Soviet warships:

, a steam frigate of the Imperial Russian Navy Baltic Fleet
 (ru), an Imperial Russian Navy corvette
 (ru), an Imperial Russian Navy gunboat commissioned in 1893
, a Soviet Navy  and one of the most famous Soviet destroyers of World War II
 (ru), a Soviet Navy 
 (ru), a Soviet Navy 
 (ru), a Russian Navy Sovremenny-class destroyer, formerly Bezuderzhny    
 (ru), a Russian Navy  commissioned in 2020

Russian Navy ship names
Soviet Navy ship names